This was the first edition of the tournament.

Andrej Martin and Tristan-Samuel Weissborn won the title after defeating Victor Vlad Cornea and Ergi Kırkın 6–1, 7–6(7–5) in the final.

Seeds

Draw

References

External links
 Main draw

Lošinj Open - Doubles